Um Só Coração is a 2004 Brazilian miniseries, produced by Rede Globo that paid homage to the city of São Paulo. It aired during the months of January, February and March 2004, when the celebration of the 450th anniversary of the founding of the city.

It presents Ana Paula Arósio, Erik Marmo, Edson Celulari, Letícia Sabatella, Herson Capri, Helena Ranaldi, Cássia Kiss, Cássio Gabus Mendes, Marcello Antony and Maria Fernanda Cândido in the lead roles.

Cast

References

External links 
 

Brazilian television miniseries
TV Globo telenovelas
Portuguese-language television shows